Corestheta is a genus of longhorn beetles of the subfamily Lamiinae, containing the following species:

 Corestheta alternata Carter, 1929
 Corestheta elongata (Broun, 1883)
 Corestheta insularis Pascoe, 1875
 Corestheta minima Breuning, 1958

References

Dorcadiini
Cerambycidae genera